Hills of Home may refer to:

Hills of Home (film), a 1948 movie in the Lassie series
"Hills of Home", a song by Hazel Dickens
Hills of Home: 25 Years of Folk Music on Rounder Records, a compilation album by Dickens
Hills of Home, a 1977 novel by Helen Bianchin
"The Hills of Home", a Beverly Hillbillies episode